Otto, Count of Lippe-Brake (21 December 1589 – 18 November 1657 in Blomberg) was the first ruling Count of Lippe-Brake.

Life 
Otto was born on 21 December 1589 as the son of Count Simon VI and his wife, Elisabeth of Holstein-Schaumburg (b. 1556) was born.

When his father died in 1613, his elder brother Simon VII took up government of the country, while the youngest brother Philip I moved to Bückeburg, where he later founded the Schaumburg-Lippe line.  In 1621, the county was divided again, and Otto received his own part and founded the Lippe-Brake line, which would die out in 1709.

Otto died on 18 November 1657 in Blomberg.

Marriage and issue 
On 30 October 1626, he married Margarethe of Nassau-Dillenburg (6 September 1606 in Beilstein – 1661), a daughter of Count George of Nassau-Dillenburg and Countess Amalia of Sayn-Wittgenstein, with whom he had the following children:
Casimir (1627-1700), married in 1663 with Countess Amalie of Sayn-Wittgenstein-Homburg (1642-1683)
 Amalia (20 September 1629 – 19 August 1676), married to Count Herman Adolph of Lippe-Detmold (1616-1666)
 Sabine (1631-1684)
 Dorothea (23 February 1633 – 1706), married in 1665) with Johann, Count of Kunowitz (1624-1700)
 William (1634-1690), married in 1667 with Countess Ludowika Margaret of Bentheim-Tecklenburg
 Maurice (1635-1666)
 Frederick (1638-1684), married in 1674 with Sophie Louise of Schleswig-Holstein-Sonderburg-Beck (1650-1714)
 Otillie (1639-1680), married in 1667 with Frederick, Duke of Löwenstein-Wertheim-Virneburg (1629-1683)
 George (1642-1703), married in 1691 with Marie Sauermann (d. 1696)
Augustus (1643-1701)

External links
 Royalty (travel) guide

Counts of Lippe
House of Lippe
1589 births
1657 deaths
17th-century German people